Agathymus alliae, the Mojave giant skipper, is a species of giant skipper in the family Hesperiidae. It is found in North America.

The MONA or Hodges number for Agathymus alliae is 4144.

Subspecies
 Agathymus alliae alliae (D. Stallings and Turner, 1957)
 Agathymus alliae paiute Roever in T. Emmel, 1998

References

Further reading

 
 
 

Megathyminae
Butterflies described in 1957